Daniil Steptšenko (born 13 August 1986) is a former Estonian biathlete.

Steptšenko was born in Narva. He competed at the 2014 Winter Olympics for Estonia where his best individual finish was 50th in the sprint.

Citing a lack of funds and support from the Estonian biathlon team, Steptšenko retired from the sport after the 2013–14 season.

References

External links
 

1986 births
Living people
Sportspeople from Narva
Estonian male biathletes
Biathletes at the 2014 Winter Olympics
Olympic biathletes of Estonia